Roger d'Amécourt is a French writer and publisher.

Selected works 
1987: Le Mariage de mademoiselle de La Verne : les avatars de la vertu, Prix Ève Delacroix 1988.

References

External links 
 Le mariage de Mademoiselle de La Verne : les avatars de la vertu on Library thing

20th-century French non-fiction writers
20th-century French male writers
French publishers (people)
Possibly living people